Fasciolopsis is a genus of trematodes. They are also known as giant intestinal flukes.

Only one species is recognised: Fasciolopsis buski. It is a notable parasite of medical importance in humans and veterinary importance in pigs. It is prevalent in Southern and Eastern Asia. The term for infestation with Fasciolopsis is fasciolopsiasis.

Fasciolopsis buski

Fasciolopsis buski is commonly called the giant intestinal fluke, because it is an exceptionally large parasitic fluke, and the largest known to parasitise humans. Its size is variable and a mature specimen might be as little as 2 cm long, but the body may grow to a length of 7.5 cm and a width of 2.5 cm. It is a common parasite of humans and pigs and is most prevalent in Southern and Southeastern Asia. It is a member of the family Fasciolidae in the order Plagiorchiida. The Echinostomida are members of the class Trematoda, the flukes. The fluke differs from most species that parasitise large mammals, in that they inhabit the gut rather than the liver as Fasciola species do. Fasciolopsis buski generally occupies the upper region of the small intestine, but in heavy infestations can also be found in the stomach and lower regions of the intestine. Fasciolopsis buski is the cause of the pathological condition fasciolopsiasis.

In London, George Busk first described Fasciolopsis buski in 1843 after finding it in the duodenum of a sailor. After years of careful study and self experimentation, in 1925, Claude Heman Barlow determined its life cycle in humans.

Morphology
Fasciolopsis buski is a large, dorsoventrally flattened fluke characterized by a blunt anterior end, undulating, unbranched ceca (sac-like cavities with single openings), tandem dendritic testes, branched ovaries, and ventral suckers to attach itself to the host. The acetabulum is larger than the oral sucker. The fluke has extensive vitelline follicles. It can be distinguished from other fasciolids by a lack of cephalic cone or "shoulders" and the unbranched ceca.

Life cycle

Adults produce over 25,000 eggs every day; these take up to seven weeks to mature and hatch at 27–32 °C. Immature, unembryonated eggs are discharged into the intestine and stool. In two weeks, eggs become embryonated in water, and after about seven weeks, tiny parasitic organisms called miracidia hatch from the eggs, which then go on to invade a suitable snail intermediate host. Several species in the genera Segmentina and Hippeutis serve as intermediate hosts. In the snail the parasite undergoes several developmental stages (sporocysts, rediae, and cercariae). The cercariae are released from the snail and encyst as metacercariae on aquatic plants such as water chestnut, water caltrop, lotus, bamboo, and other edible plants. The mammalian final host becomes infected by ingesting metacercariae on the aquatic plants. After ingestion, the metacercariae excyst in the duodenum in about three months and attach to the intestinal wall. There they develop into adults (20 to 75 mm by 8 to 20 mm) in approximately three months, remaining attached to the intestinal wall of the mammalian hosts (humans and pigs). The adults have a life span of about one year.

References

External links

 Centers for Disease Control and Prevention (CDC)
 North-Eastern Hill University
 BioLib
 The Taxonomicon
 Atlas of Medical Parasitology
 ZipcodeZoo
 Parasites in Humans
Fasciolopsiasis in children: Clinical,Sociodemographic Profile and outcome. Indian Journal of Medical Microbiology2017 vol 35, issue 4 page 551-554 DOI:10.4103/ijmm.IJMM_17_7
 http://www.ijmm.org/text.asp?2017/35/4/551/224440

Fasciolidae
Trematode genera
Monotypic protostome genera
Parasitic helminths of humans